Kristian Haugaard Jensen (born 27 February 1991) is a Danish former professional cyclist.

Major results

2009
 5th Overall Tour du Pays de Vaud
1st Stage 1
2010
 6th Overall Coupe des nations Ville Saguenay
2012
 2nd Fyen Rundt
2013
 1st Stage 1 Flèche du Sud
 1st  Mountains classification Tour de l'Avenir
 2nd Overall Czech Cycling Tour
1st Stage 1 (TTT)
 3rd Road race, National Under-23 Road Championships
 4th La Côte Picarde
 5th Ronde van Vlaanderen U23
 7th Overall Istrian Spring Trophy
 7th Overall Troféu Joaquim Agostinho
1st  Young rider classification
 9th Overall Course de la Paix U23
2014
 3rd Overall Circuit des Ardennes
 5th Dorpenomloop Rucphen
 6th Overall Oberösterreichrundfahrt
 7th Overall Triptyque des Monts et Châteaux
 9th Overall Ronde de l'Oise

References

External links

1991 births
Living people
Danish male cyclists